33rd Brigade or 33rd Infantry Brigade may refer to:

 33rd Brigade (Australia), a unit of the Australian Army
 33 Canadian Brigade Group, a unit of the Canadian Army
 33rd Mechanized Infantry Brigade (Greece)
 33rd Indian Brigade of the British Indian Army in the First World War
 33rd Indian Infantry Brigade of the British Indian Army in the Second World War
 33rd Infantry Brigade Combat Team (United States), a unit of the United States Army
 33rd Al-Mahdi Brigade (Iran)

United Kingdom
 33rd (Western) Anti-Aircraft Brigade
 33rd Armoured Brigade (United Kingdom)
 33rd Infantry Brigade (United Kingdom)

See also
 33rd Division (disambiguation)
 33rd Regiment (disambiguation)
 33rd Squadron (disambiguation)